Osher (Usher, Asher) Zelig Weiss (Hebrew: אשר וייס; born March 25, 1953) is a posek, the current rosh kollel of Machon Minchas Osher L’Torah V’Horaah and author of the Minchas Osher. He grew up in a Klausenberger family in Borough Park, Brooklyn.

Biography
Rav Asher was born in the United States to Moshe Weiss, a Holocaust survivor and real estate agent. He studied at Sanz institutions in the United States. In 1956 the family immigrated to Israel on Aliyah and lived in Kiryat Sanz in Netanya. He studied at institutions there and was close to the Admor Rav Yekusiel Yehudah Halberstam. In 2005, he founded Yeshivat Darchei Torah and has headed it ever since. In its early years, Rabbi Baruch Dov Povarsky, head of the Ponevezh Yeshiva, also served alongside him.

Rav Asher is known as one of the leading Torah personalities of the generation, impacting thousands around the world through his shiurim, halachic responsa and leadership. His teshuvos and insight are a guiding light to rabbonim and poskim all around the globe. In addition to his rigorous daily schedule of learning, teaching advising and writing, Weiss serves as the posek for Shaarei Tzedek Medical Center, maintains a Beis Din l’Hora’ah, Beis Din Tzedek Darchei Torah, and heads Kollelim to help engage with the community and raise the next generation of talmidei chachamim and dayanim in Klal Yisroel. The Keren Hachesed ‘Chasdei Pesia’ helps those in need, including widows, orphans and people struggling with financial hardship or physical illness. The Keren HaChesed provides financial support and other assistance and is under the full supervision of Rav Asher. The Keren was established in memory of his wife, Rebbitzen Pesia Yenta Weiss a”h, whose life was dedicated to helping others. He is the Rosh Kollel of Machon Minchas Osher L’Torah V’Horaah.

Rav Asher is well known as the author of the Minchas Osher seforim on Moadim, Torah, medicine and responsa. In 2021 he published a volume of the Minchat Asher responsa, which deals with the issues raised by the coronavirus in Israel and its halakhic implications. He is a well known posek, and is well known in Haredi circles for having traveled to the United States with Rabbi Aharon Leib Shteinman and Rabbi Yaakov Aryeh Alter, the Gerrer Rebbe. He also frequently gives classes at American yeshivot in Israel.

Family
Rabbi Weiss was married to Rebbetzin Pesiah Zalmanowitz, the daughter of Rabbi Yisrael Aryeh Zalmanowitz, and together, they had 6 children. Rebbetzin Pesiah died in 2018.

References

External links
Rabbi Aharon Shteinman, The Gerrer Rebbe, and Rav Usher Weiss visit Los Angeles at Google Videos
Audio lectures given by Rabbi Asher Weiss
His shiurim, classes and responsa

Hasidic rabbis in Israel
Hasidic rosh yeshivas
Living people
People from Borough Park, Brooklyn
Orthodox rabbis
1953 births
American emigrants to Israel
21st-century Israeli rabbis